Rick J. Hillier  (born 1955) is a retired Canadian Forces general, who served as the chief of the Defence Staff (CDS) from 4 February 2005 to 1 July 2008. He previously served as the chief of the Land Staff from 30 May 2003 until his promotion to CDS.

From 23 November 2020 to 31 March 2021, Hillier oversaw the province of Ontario's vaccination task-force in response to the COVID-19 pandemic in Ontario.

Early life and education
Born in 1955 to Jack and Myrtle Hillier in Campbellton, Notre Dame Bay, Newfoundland, he was the fourth of six children, with him being the only boy. He attended Greenwood High School and graduated in June 1972. 

Hillier intended to join the military early, at 16. After receiving his father's permission, Hillier submitted his application to join the Canadian Forces in Spring 1972. He initially wanted to be a fighter pilot, but failed the medical examination. He then applied to join the Canadian Forces as an officer cadet at the Royal Military College of Canada but was rejected. At a similar time, he applied to and was accepted by Memorial University of Newfoundland and the Royal Canadian Mounted Police. Hillier chose to attend Memorial University, studying biology. While at Memorial University, his application to become an officer cadet was accepted, but he chose to continue studying in Newfoundland as part of the Regular Officer Training Program. 

While studying he met his wife, Joyce and they were married in Lower Island, Conception Bay, Newfoundland.

Early military career
In January 1998, as commander of 2 CMBG, he led Operation Recuperation, the Canadian Forces' intervention in the paralyzing ice storm in Ontario, Quebec and New Brunswick. He went on to command the Multi-National Division (South-West) in Bosnia-Herzegovina.

He was named chief of the land staff, commanding Land Force Command, on May 30, 2003. He is noted for his public calls for increased resources for the Canadian Forces. In 2003, when he was appointed chief of the land staff, he said, "Any commander who would stand up here and say that we didn't need more soldiers should be tarred and feathered and rode out of town on a rail." After serving as chief of the land staff and before being appointed chief of the defence staff, he commanded the NATO ISAF in Afghanistan from February 9 to August 12, 2004.

Chief of the Defence Staff
On February 4, 2005, Hillier became chief of the defence staff. At the change-of-command ceremony he repeated his call, more broadly, for increased military funding. "In this country, we could probably not give enough resources to the men and women to do all the things that we ask them to do," he said, with Prime Minister Paul Martin and Minister of National Defence Bill Graham looking on. "But we can give them too little, and that is what we are now doing. Remember them in your budgets." Upon his appointment, he became the highest-ranking military officer from Newfoundland and Labrador.

Uncle Rick
Hillier was a popular CDS. When speaking to troops on parade, he would frequently call them into a hollow circle around him rather than delivering a generic speech from a podium while they stood to attention. At briefings, Hillier asked every person what they thought about a situation at hand – regardless of their rank, language, or nationality.

Media criticism
Hillier was known for his plain-spoken language and focus on frontline capabilities. Early in his term as CDS, he drew criticism from the media when he called terrorists "detestable murderers and scumbags". He went further, saying "we're not the public service of Canada. We're not just another department. We are the Canadian Forces, and our job is to be able to kill people."

Resignation
On April 15, 2008, Hillier announced he would step down as CDS on July 1, 2008.

Hillier was subsequently appointed as chancellor of Memorial University of Newfoundland, effective July 3, 2008.

Post-military

Public speaking
Upon retirement in 2008, Hillier joined the public speaking arena and developed his own speaking agency.

Working with a number of large corporate clients, Hillier's speaking detailed the experiences of troops under his command, emphasizing the theme of "leadership in tough times."

Project Hero
In 2009, Hillier co-founded Project Hero, a scholarship program for the children of Canadian Forces personnel killed while on active military duty. The Children of Deceased Veterans – Education Assistance Act verification is used to verify Project Hero eligibility. The process is administered by Veterans Affairs Canada.

Academic
On August 14, 2008, Telus announced that Hillier was appointed as chair of Telus Atlantic Canada Community Board. Hillier said, “Telus is a company that gets stuff done both in business and in the community – I like that. They are entrusting their philanthropic efforts in Atlantic Canada to people who live and work here. I'm excited about the opportunity to help Telus engage with the Atlantic Canada communities that are so very important to me.”

TD Bank
Hillier announced on September 3, 2008, he will be working at an Ottawa office for the TD Bank to support initiatives that enhance the client and customer experience and to assist the bank's ongoing leadership development and training activities.

Provincial Aerospace
On June 16, 2009, while attending the 48th International Paris Air Show, Provincial Aerospace announced that Hillier will join the company’s Advisory Board.

Politics
Since his retirement from the military Hillier's name has been mentioned as a leadership candidate for several political parties. Hillier's name was mentioned by political pundits as a possible successor to Prime Minister Stephen Harper, during Harper's minority Conservative government. When Newfoundland and Labrador Premier Danny Williams retired from politics in 2010, Hillier's name was brought up as a possible successor to the Progressive Conservative premier. In August 2011, his name was brought up once again as a potential Liberal leader in his home province, when leader Yvonne Jones resigned. Hillier has stated on several occasions however that he has no interest in politics.

COVID-19 vaccine task-force for Ontario
In November 2020, Hillier was appointed as the chair of the vaccine distribution taskforce for Ontario by Premier Doug Ford in response to the COVID-19 pandemic in Ontario. Hillier leads the task-force in its rollout and distribution of COVID-19 vaccines approved by Health Canada, distributed federally and administered by the province. After the Christmas and holiday season in December, 2020, Hillier formally apologized to Ontarians for halting vaccine administration for a number of days, calling the move a "mistake". Hillier left the position March 31, 2021. He was replaced with Homer Tien as operation lead.

Honours
In 2011, he was made an officer of the Order of Canada "for his service to our nation, which has inspired pride in our Canadian Forces". In December 2013, it was announced that Hillier would be appointed to the Order of Newfoundland and Labrador by Lieutenant Governor Frank Fagan during a ceremony in February 2014.

Scholastic

 University degrees

 Chancellor, visitor, governor, rector and fellowships

Honorary degrees

Awards

Works
Hillier, Rick (2010) A Soldier First: Bullets, Bureaucrats and the Politics of War; hardcover, 552 pages; published by HarperCollins Publishers Ltd; .
Hillier, Rick (2010) Leadership: 50 Points of Wisdom for Today's Leaders; hardcover, 272 pages; published by Harper Collins Publishers Ltd; .

References

Sources

External links
GeneralHillier.com, his personal website.
Interview with Rick Hillier on The Hour.
 Interview with Rick Hillier on George Stroumboulopoulos Tonight (starts at 9:45), recorded December 1, 2010.
CBC News Indepth background Career timeline (CBC)
"Hillier gets combat-ready for business world", Globe & Mail, July 6, 2008
Gowlings press release, July 7, 2008
Canada's 25 Most Renowned Military Leaders

|-

|-

|-

|-

1955 births
Chiefs of the Defence Staff (Canada)
Living people
Canadian generals
Canadian university and college chancellors
Officers of the Order of Canada
People from Newfoundland (island)
Members of the Order of Newfoundland and Labrador
Memorial University of Newfoundland alumni
Commanders of the Order of Military Merit (Canada)
Recipients of the Meritorious Service Decoration
Royal Military College of Canada people
Commanders of the Canadian Army
Recipients of the Queen's Commendation for Bravery